Arnold Hauser (art historian) (1892 – 1978), Hungarian writer
Arnold George "Peewee" Hauser (1888 – 1966) or Arnold Hauser (shortstop), US Baseball player